Pierre Milza (16 April 193228 February 2018) was a French historian. His work focused mainly on the history of Italy, the history of Italian immigration to France and the history of fascism, of which he was a recognized specialist.

He was professor emeritus at the Paris Institute of Political Studies (Sciences Po), where he taught contemporary history.

Pierre Milza is notably the author of Voyage en Italie, or "History of Italy", as well as of biographies of Mussolini, Napoleon III and Garibaldi.

Early life 
Milza was a second-generation Italian immigrant, born in Paris, France to Italian parents. His father, Olivier Milza, was born near Parma in Italy. His status as an immigrant motivated his studies in Italian history and Italian-French immigration. Milza first visited Italy at 16, learned Italian and began to study history.

Distinctions 
 Knight of the Order of Arts and Letters
 1994: Grand Officer of the Order of Merit of the Italian Republic
 2008: Commander of the National Order of Merit
 2013: Commander of the National Order of the Legion of Honour (named Officer in 2000)
Milza was a member of the François Mitterrand Institute.

Publications 
Throughout his career, Milza wrote many books about fascism and the history of Italy. In addition to these publications, Milza devoted time to writing biographies for different figures including Mussolini, Voltaire, Garibaldi and Napoleon III.

Independently 

 
 
 
 
 Volume I: De 1945 à 1973
 Volume II: De 1871 à 1914
 Conversations Hitler-Mussolini
 
  (2 volumes)
 
 
 
 
 Mussolini
 
 
 
 
 Voltaire
  
 Volume I: 
 Volume II: 
 
 
 Garibaldi

With Serge Berstein 
Milza collaborated with fellow historian Serge Berstein to produce academic works and textbooks. 
 
 
 
 
 
 
 
 (5 volume series)

Other collaborations 
  (with Marianne Amar)
  (with Marie-Claude Blanc-Chaléard)
  (with Marianne Benteli)
  (with Antoine Marès)

References

External links 
 

1932 births
2018 deaths
20th-century French historians
Historians of fascism
French people of Italian descent
Officiers of the Légion d'honneur
Commanders of the Ordre national du Mérite
French male writers
Historians of Italy
Academic staff of Sciences Po
Historians of World War II
Historians of France
Writers from Paris